Patrick Blomberg (born 27 January 1994) is a Swedish professional ice hockey player. He is currently playing for HC Vita Hästen in HockeyAllsvenskan.

Career statistics

External links

1994 births
Living people
Borås HC players
Malmö Redhawks players
Swedish ice hockey left wingers
Timrå IK players
Tyringe SoSS players
VIK Västerås HK players
Ice hockey people from Stockholm